Apollo Citharoedus (Cithara-playing Apollo), also known as Apollo Musagetes ("Apollo, Leader of the Muses") is a 2nd-century AD colossal marble statue of Apollo by an unknown Roman artist.  It is a major example of the Apollo Citharoedus statue type.

Apollo is here crowned with laurel and wears the long, flowing robe of the Ionic bard. 
The statue was found with seven statues of the Muses near Tivoli, Italy, in 1774, in the ruins of Cassius' villa, and is now preserved in the Hall of the Muses, standing along with the seven statues in the Museo Pio-Clementino of the Vatican Museums.

References

Sculptures of the Vatican Museums
2nd-century Roman sculptures
Musical instruments in art
Sculptures of Apollo